The Canal de Brouage connects the Canal de la Charente à la Seudre to Brouage.

See also
 List of canals in France

References

Brouage
Canals opened in 1807